West Malvern is a village and a civil parish on the west side of the north part of the Malvern Hills, on the western edge of Worcestershire, England. It has become effectively a suburb of Malvern and part of an urban area often called The Malverns, locally administered by Malvern Hills District Council and its own parish council. Its altitude up to 250 metres gives West Malvern panoramic views of the Herefordshire countryside to the west. The Church of St James, built in 1840, has an adjacent Church of England primary school. The churchyard includes the grave of Peter Mark Roget, author of Roget's Thesaurus, who died while on holiday in the village. The 2011 Census population of 1,385 was estimated at 1,263 in 2019.

Culture
Since 2005 West Malvern has hosted an annual one-day music festival West Fest. In years when West Fest makes a profit the committee distributes grants "to support community action, cultural development, training or to meet special needs." From the profits of West Fest 2008 "a total of £7,150 was distributed" in the Malvern Hills area to 2nd Malvern Link Brownies, the Theatre of Small Convenience, West Malvern Sean Éireann McMahon Academy (Irish dancing), West Malvern Cricket Club, Malvern Mencap, St James Primary School, Leapfrogs Playgroup, and Malvern Access Group. There has also been a regular weekly acoustic music session in the village each Sunday evening since 1996.

On 20–22 August 2010 a visual arts festival was held in the village, in support of the Malvern Hills Community Foundation, in a variety of venues including the Regents Theological College, St James's Church, St James Primary School, and the Brewers Arms pub. Local garages, gazebos, and even garden walls and railings were also used to display artworks. The event, which is intended to become annual, was modelled on a similar arts festival at Saint-Céneri-le-Gérei in Normandy, France.

Landmarks
The Malvern Hills area is well known for its Malvern water and there are several springs and wells in West Malvern including Westminster Bank Spout, St James Churchyard Basin, West Malvern Tap, Hayslad, Royal Well, and Ryland's Well and St Thomas' Well.

There were quarries around West Malvern including Dingle and several more.

Transport

Rail
The nearest railway stations are Malvern Link (for the northern end of the parish) and Colwall (for the southern end), both on the Cotswold Line between Hereford and Worcester.

Bus
Local bus services connect West Malvern with the surrounding area.

References

External links

West Malvern Parish Council
West Malvern Hall and Village
Vision of Britain Historical record
West Malvern historical photographs
Dingle Quarry
Historical photos of West Malvern quarries
West Malvern Village web site

Villages in Worcestershire
Civil parishes in Worcestershire